Meron Reuben (born 1961, Cape Town, South Africa) is an Israeli diplomat who has served as Permanent Representative of Israel to the United Nations (2010-2011), Ambassador to Paraguay, Bolivia and Colombia.  Reuben has been Consul General, since November 2020, to  New England. From 2015 until 2020, he was Chief of State Protocol.  He replaced Zeev Boker as Consul. He worked behind the scenes at the meetings that led to the Abraham Accords.

Biography
A South African native, Reuben at some point moved to London, United Kingdom with his mother before making Aliyah to Israel in 1974. He is a graduate of the Hebrew University of Jerusalem where he studied diplomacy and international relations.

He has two daughters from am earlier marriage that he raises with his partner David.

References

Living people
1961 births
People from Cape Town
Permanent Representatives of Israel to the United Nations
Hebrew University of Jerusalem alumni
Ambassadors of Israel to Paraguay
Ambassadors of Israel to Colombia
Ambassadors of Israel to Bolivia
Israeli consuls
Gay diplomats